La Recoleta Cemetery is a national cemetery located on the Avenue Mariscal López, Recoleta, Asunción, Paraguay. It contains the graves of important figures in the country's history, including  presidents of Paraguay.
The Cemetery is open to the public and has an area of about 14 hectares.

History

The cemetery is on the site of a Franciscan Recollets convent,  nationalised by José Gaspar Rodríguez de Francia who had appointed himself head of the Paraguayan Church.

Its origin dates from 20 October 1842 the date of its establishment by the government of Carlos Antonio López and consul Mariano Roque Alonso. Its creation was due to the lack of space for the burial of the deceased. Prior to this, remains were buried in churches or in the patios of houses. It was the first general public cemetery in the city and the country.

Notable interments

 Augusto Roa Bastos (1917–2005), author
  (1963–2009), singer
 León Cadogan (1899–1973), ethnologist
 Serafina Dávalos (1883–1957), prominent feminist and lawyer
 Alejandro Guanes (1872–1925), poet and journalist
 Hermann Guggiari (1924–2012), engineer and sculptor
 Eliza Lynch (1833–1886), First Lady of Paraguay
 Ananías Maidana (1923–2010), teacher and politician
 Epifanio Méndez Fleitas (1917–1985), musician, writer and poet
  (1926–2003), journalist, writer, playwright and poet
 Fulgencio R. Moreno (1872–1933), journalist
 Luis Alberto del Paraná (1926–1974), singer and guitarist
 Marcelo Pecci (1976–2022), anti-drug and organized crime prosecutor
 Silvio Pettirossi (1887–1916), aviation pioneer
 María Odulia Nicola Ruotti (1922–2006), singer and composer
 Adela Speratti (1865–1902), educator
 Celsa Speratti (1868–1938), educator
  (1780–1856), architect
 William Henry Keld Whytehead (1825–1865), engineer-in-chief to the Government of Paraguay
 Roque Vallejos (1943–2006), poet, psychiatrist and essayist

Presidents
 Patricio Escobar (1843–1912), 10th President of Paraguay
 Juan Gualberto González (1851–1912), 11th President of Paraguay
 Emilio Aceval (1853–1931), 14th President of Paraguay
 Andrés Héctor Carvallo (1862–1934), 15th President of Paraguay
 Juan Antonio Escurra (1859–1929), 16th President of Paraguay
 Cecilio Báez (1862–1941), 18th President of Paraguay
 Emiliano González Navero (1861–1934), 20th President of Paraguay
 Pedro Peña (1864–1943), 24th President of Paraguay
 Eduardo Schaerer (1873–1941), 25th President of Paraguay
 Luis Alberto Riart (1880–1953), 31st President of Paraguay
 José Patricio Guggiari (1884–1957), 32nd President of Paraguay
 Rafael Franco (1896–1973), 32nd President of Paraguay
 Higinio Morínigo (1897–1983), 35th President of Paraguay
 Juan Manuel Frutos (1879–1960), 36th President of Paraguay
 Raimundo Rolón (1903–1981), 38th President of Paraguay
 Felipe Molas López (1901–1954), 39th President of Paraguay
 Federico Chávez (1882–1978), 40th President of Paraguay

Gallery

References

External links
 Cementerio La Recoleta Municipality of Asunción
 Cementerio de la Recoleta BillionGraves

Cemeteries established in the 1840s
Cemeteries in Paraguay
National cemeteries